Can't Swim is an American rock band from Keansburg, New Jersey.

Career
Can't Swim signed to Pure Noise Records in December 2015. Following the signing, Can't Swim released their first EP a few months later in 2016 titled Death Deserves a Name. In February 2017, the band announced plans to release their debut studio album. The album, Fail You Again, was released on March 10, 2017 via Pure Noise Records.

On October 4, 2018, the band released a new single (with an accompanying music video) titled "My Queen." They also released an album titled This Too Won't Pass, on November 16, 2018.

On October 11, 2019, Can’t Swim released a new EP titled "Foreign Language". This EP featured a whole new artistic direction with a heavier sound than previous releases.

On May 6, 2020, Can’t Swim released a new 4 Song EP titled “When the Dust Settles” featuring newly arranged tracks taken from their previous releases. 

On December 4, 2020, Can't Swim released their 4th EP "Someone Who Isn't Me" featuring yet another new artistic direction featuring a more electronic sound than previous releases.

On October 22, 2021, Can't Swim released their 3rd LP "Change of Plans" marking a turning point in the bands career as it combines all the elements from previous releases into one unified sound.

On March 3, 2023, Can't Swim released their 4th LP "Thanks but No Thanks", continuing to develop their sound.

Band members

Current members
 Chris LoPorto – lead vocals, guitar (2015–present)
 Greg McDevitt – bass, backing vocals (2015–present)
 Danny Rico – lead guitar, backing vocals (2017–present), drums (2015–2017)
 Blake Gamel – Drums (2021–present)

Former members
 Andrea Morgan – drums (2017–2018)
 Michael Sichel - drums (2018-2021)
 Mike "Chez" Sanchez – rhythm guitar (2015–present), lead guitar (2015–2023)

Discography
Studio albums
Fail You Again (2017, Pure Noise)
This Too Won't Pass (2018, Pure Noise)
Change of Plans (2021, Pure Noise)
Thanks but No Thanks (2023, Pure Noise)
EPs
Death Deserves a Name (2016, Pure Noise)
Foreign Language (2019, Pure Noise)
When the Dust Settles (2020, Pure Noise)
Someone Who Isn't Me (2020, Pure Noise)

References

Musical groups from New Jersey
People from Keansburg, New Jersey
Pure Noise Records artists